The Mitsubishi J2M Raiden (雷電, "Lightning Bolt") is a single-engined land-based fighter aircraft used by the Imperial Japanese Navy Air Service in World War II. The Allied reporting name was "Jack".

Design and development
The J2M was designed by Jiro Horikoshi, creator of the A6M Zero, to meet the 14-Shi (14th year of the Showa reign, or 1939) official specification. It was to be a strictly local-defense interceptor, intended to counter the threat of high-altitude bomber raids, and thus relied on speed, climb performance, and armament at the expense of manoeuvrability. The J2M was a sleek, but stubby craft with its oversized Mitsubishi Kasei engine buried behind a long cowling, cooled by an intake fan and connected to the propeller with an extension shaft.

Teething development problems stemming from the Kasei engine cooling system, and the main undercarriage members led to a slowdown in production. A continual set of modifications resulted in new variants being introduced with the ultimate high-altitude variant, the J2M4 Model 34 flying for the first time in August 1944. Two upward-aimed, oblique-firing (aimed at seventy degrees) 20 mm cannons, mounted in the German Schräge Musik style, were fitted behind the cockpit with the four wing cannons retained. Unresolved difficulties with the turbo supercharger caused the project to be terminated after only two experimental J2M4s were built.

Operational history

The first few produced J2M2s were delivered to the development units in December 1942 but severe problems were encountered with the engines. Trials and improvements took almost a year and the first batch of the serial built J2M2 Model 11 was delivered to 381st Kōkūtai in December 1943. Parallel with the J2M2, production of the J2M3 Raiden Model 21 started. The first J2M3s appeared in October 1943 but deliveries to combat units started at the beginning of February 1944.

The Raiden made its combat debut in June 1944 during the Battle of the Philippine Sea. Several J2Ms operated from Guam and Saipan and a small number of aircraft were deployed to the Philippines. Later, some J2Ms were based in Japanese airfields in Korea under Genzan Ku: Genzan (Wonsan); Ranan (Nanam); Funei (Nuren); Rashin (Najin); and Konan, for defense of these areas and fighting against Soviet Naval Aviation units.

Primarily designed to defend against the Boeing B-29 Superfortress, the type was handicapped at high altitude by the lack of a turbocharger. However, its four-cannon armament supplied effective firepower and the use of dive and zoom tactics allowed it to score occasionally.

Insufficient numbers and the American switch to night bombing in March 1945 limited its effectiveness.

J2Ms took part in one of the final aerial combats of the Second World War when four Raidens, accompanied by eight Mitsubishi A6M Zeros, all belonging to the 302nd Kokutai, intercepted a formation of US Navy F6F Hellcats from the aircraft-carrier USS Yorktown (CV-10) during the morning of 15 August 1945 over the Kanto Plain. In the engagement, that took place only two hours before Japan officially announced its surrender, four Hellcats were lost along with two Raidens and two Zeros.

U.S. Technical Air Intelligence Command (TAIC) tested two captured J2Ms using 92 octane fuel plus methanol and calculated maximum speeds using measurements. The J2M2 (Jack11) achieved a speed of 655 km/h (407 mph) at 5,520 m (17,400 ft), and the J2M3 (Jack21) achieved a speed of 671 km/h (417 mph) at 4,980 m (16,600 ft).

Variants
 J2M1 Prototype: fitted with the 1,044 kW (1,400 hp) Mitsubishi MK4C Kasei 13 14-cylinder air-cooled radial engine, and armed with two 7.7 mm (.303 in) Type 97 machine guns in the upper fuselage and two wing-mounted 20 mm Type 99 Model II cannon. - Eight builds.
 J2M2 Model 11: Powered by 1,379 kW (1,850 hp) Mitsubishi MK4R-A Kasei 23a 14-cylinder radial engine, same armament as the J2M1.
 J2M3 Model 21: Armed with two wing-mounted 20 mm Type 99 Model II cannon and two wing-mounted 20 mm Type 99 Model I cannon.
 J2M3a Model 21A: Armed with four wing-mounted 20 mm Type 99 Model II cannon.
 J2M4 Model 32: Prototype fitted with the 1,357 kW (1,820 hp) Mitsubishi MK4R-C Kasei 23c engine. Many armament configurations have been reported, e.g., fuselage-mounted oblique-firing 20 mm Type 99 Model I cannon designed to fire upward as it passed underneath a bomber, two wing-mounted 20 mm Type 99 Model II cannon, and two wing-mounted 20 mm Type 99 Model I cannon.
 J2M5 Model 33: High altitude variant powered by 1,357 kW (1,820 hp) Mitsubishi MK4U-A Kasei 26a engine with mechanically driven supercharger, giving increased high-altitude speed at the expense of range. Two 20 mm Type 99 cannon in fuselage, two 20 mm Type 99 Model II cannon in wings.
 J2M5a Model 33A: Armed with four wing-mounted 20 mm Type 99 Model II cannon. Wing cannon were harmonized in trajectory and ballistics with each 200 rpg.
 J2M6 Model 31: Chronologically earlier than J2M4 and J2M5 this version was based on J2M3. Had wider cockpit and improved bubble canopy later used in J2M3 built since July 1943.
 J2M6a Model 31A: Chronologically earlier than J2M4 and J2M5 this version was based on J2M3a. Had wider cockpit and improved bubble canopy later used in J2M3a built since July 1943. One J2M6a was built.
 J2M7 Model 23A: J2M3 powered by Kasei 26a engine, a few built.
 J2M7a Model 23A: J2M3a powered by Kasei 26a engine, a few built.

Production
After the decisive Battle of Midway in 1942 Japan's military leaders rushed to re-equip their forces for defense of the home islands. In fighter designs the interceptor role now took priority over forward projection of offensive power. Allied forces, meanwhile, sought to establish air superiority over Japanese-held territories via B-29 bombing raids on industrial targets.

The struggle to meet production demands sparked a Japanese initiative to recruit shonenko (child labour) from Taiwan (Formosa). Though the target of 25,000 youths was never reached, over 8,400 Taiwanese youths aged 12 to 14 relocated to Mitsubishi plants to help build the J2M Raiden.

The Allied advance took its toll. In 1945 aircraft production in Japan collapsed, as numbers for the J2M reflect.

  Allied bombing raids began in December 1944 and progressively disrupted production of the J2M. A direct hit on the Mitsubishi Dai San Kokuki Seisakusho aircraft plant caused the complete loss of airframes, machine tools, and jigs. This halted further production.

 Production generally suffered less from direct hits on factories, which were rare, but from attacks on suppliers and consequent shortages of material and construction tools.

Operators

 Imperial Japanese Navy Air Service
 256th Kōkūtai November 1944 - December 1945
 301st Kōkūtai February 1944 - July 1945
 302nd Kōkūtai March 1945 - August 1945
 332nd Kōkūtai August 1944 - August 1945
 352nd Kōkūtai August 1944 - August 1945
 381st Kōkūtai End 1943 - April 1945
 Yokosuka Kōkūtai
 Yatabe Kōkūtai
 Genzan Kōkūtai
 Tainan Kōkūtai
 Konoike Kōkūtai
 Chushi Kōkūtai

Surviving aircraft

J2M3 Model 21 c/n 3014 is on display at the Planes of Fame museum in Chino, California.

Specifications (J2M3)

See also

Notes

Bibliography
 The Complete Encyclopedia of World Aircraft New York: Barnes & Noble, 1977. .
  (new edition 1987 by Putnam Aeronautical Books, .)
 Green, William. Air Enthusiast Magazine, Quarterly Volume 1, Number 2 Bromley, Kent: Pilot Press, 1971.
 Green, William. Warplanes of the Second World War, Volume Three: Fighters. London: Macdonald & Co. (Publishers) Ltd., 1973, First edition 1961. .

 Izawa, Yasuho & Holmes, Tony. J2M Raiden and N1K1/2 Shiden/Shiden-Kai Aces. Bloomsbury Publishing. 2016. .

 United States Strategic Bombing Survey Aircraft Division. Mitsubishi Heavy Industries, Ltd. Corporation Report I, Washington, D.C. 1947.
 United States Strategic Bombing Survey Aircraft Division. Army Air Arsenal and Navy Air Depots Corporation Report XIX, Washington, D.C. 1947.

External links

 J2M article on www.combinedfleet.com
 "Song of Raiden fighter squadron", Nippon News, No. 254. in the official website of NHK.

Low-wing aircraft
J02M, Mitsubishi
J02M, Mitsubishi
J2M
Single-engined tractor aircraft
Aircraft first flown in 1942